The Celestial City may refer to:

 The Celestial City (novel), a 1926 novel by the Hungarian writer Baroness Orczy 
 The Celestial City (film), a 1929 British film